Elizabeth Indino Ramsey (December 3, 1931 – October 8, 2015) was a Filipina singer, comedian, and actress. During her almost six-decade career, she established herself as an iconic showbiz personality and entertainer. Ramsey's unique appearance courtesy of her Filipino-Jamaican blood, stage antics, irreverent humor, and punchlines delivered in her heavy Visayan accent brought her into prominence in the Filipino entertainment industry. She is also the mother of popular Filipina singer Jaya.

Early life

Ramsey was born on December 3, 1931 in San Carlos City, Negros Occidental, to Arturo C. Ramsey, a United States merchant marine of Jamaican descent who was stationed in the Philippines, and Marcelina Rivera Indino; born in San Carlos City to a family of Filipino and Spanish descent.

Career
Ramsey's career began in 1958 after winning a singing contest in Student Canteen, the first noontime show on Philippine television.  After her win, Ramsey was immediately offered a slot to be a performer at the Manila Grand Opera House and then eventually the famous Clover Theater. Her raspy vocals and energetic live performances of rock and roll songs earned her the title as the country's "Queen of Rock and Roll". Some of her trademark songs include "Proud Mary", "Razzle Dazzle", and "Waray-Waray".

As early as 1961, she began performing in Las Vegas and different parts of the United States. She became the first Filipino to star in the Philippine Festival Las Vegas production of producer Steve Parker, ex-husband of actress Shirley MacLaine. She performed for soldiers in American bases in the Philippines and on the USS Enterprise for wounded American servicemen during the Vietnam War. Ramsey also ventured into acting and starred in notable films including Prinsesa Naranja (1960), Reyna ng Pitong Gatang (1980), and Ang Bukas ay Akin (1963), in which she was nominated for best supporting actress in the 1963 FAMAS Awards for her performance. In 1976, she gained household name status after playing Cleopatra in a popular Superwheel Detergent Bar commercial.

In the '90s, she returned to the Philippines after living in the United States for several years and made a successful showbiz comeback by appearing in numerous movies and TV shows.

Personal life
Ramsey had 4 children (Isaac Johnson Jr., Mary Ann Johnson, Susan Johnson and Maria Luisa Ramsey). She was married to Black American US military merchant marine, Isaac Johnson, Sr.

Death
Ramsey died October 8, 2015 in her sleep from a hyperglycemic attack at the age of 83.

References

External links

1931 births
2015 deaths
Filipino women comedians
20th-century Filipino women singers
Filipino people of Jamaican descent
Filipino people of Spanish descent
Filipino television actresses
Filipino television personalities
Visayan people
People from San Carlos, Negros Occidental
Singers from Negros Occidental
Actresses from Negros Occidental